This is a timeline of the history of rugby league on television in the UK.

1940s and 1950s 

 1948
 1 May – The BBC broadcasts the Rugby League Challenge Cup final for the first time, although this can only be seen in the London area. It shows the event again in 1952 by which time it can be seen in the north of England.

 1949 to 1954
 No events.

 1955
 October–November – The newly launched ITV creates a rugby league tournament called the Independent Television Floodlit Trophy. Played under floodlights at various London football grounds, the tournament was shown live in the London area only because ITV had not launched in the sport's north of England heartlands. The second halves of the matches are shown live. The competition was a one-off and did not return the following year.

 1956
 No events.

 1957
 No events.

 1958
 The BBC broadcasts the Challenge Cup final for the third time and this marks the start of annual coverage of the final.

 1959
 No events.

1960s
 1960 to 1964
 No events although during this period, Grandstand shows coverage of earlier rounds from the Challenge Cup for the first time.

 1965
 6 October – The first edition of the BBC2 Floodlit Trophy is broadcast, bringing rugby league to television screens on a regular basis for the first time. The competition is designed specifically for television.

 1966 to 1969
 No events although for a brief period during the late 1960s, World of Sport shows coverage of the Challenge Cup.

1970s
 1970 to 1978
 No events.

 1979
 18 December – The final BBC2 Floodlit Trophy takes place. The programme ends due to financial cutbacks at the BBC.

1980s 
 1980 
 No events.

 1981
 No events.

 1982
 19 May – For the only time since 1958, the BBC does not show live coverage of the final of the Challenge Cup. It had shown the original game live 18 days earlier but opted to show the replay in highlights form only, as part of that week's edition of Sportsnight.

 1983
 No events.

 1984
 No events.

 1985
 No events.

 1986
 No events.

 1987
 For a brief period, Yorkshire Television broadcasts a late night rugby league highlights programme called Scrumdown.

 1988
 No events.

 1989
 No events.

1990s 
 1990
 No events.

 1991
 No events.

 1992
 24 October – The BBC shows live coverage of the 1992 Rugby League World Cup Final.

 1993
 No events.

 1994
 No events.

 1995
 7–28 October – L!VE TV broadcasts many of the matches from the 1995 Rugby League World Cup. It shows many of them exclusively because apart from the opening game, the BBC does not show any live matches apart from the semi-final and final.

 1996
 Following an approach by Rupert Murdoch to British rugby league clubs to form a new Super League, the sport agrees to the proposals, which amongst other things sees the sport move from a winter to a summer season. Consequently, all live league coverage is shown exclusively on Sky Sports. The deal sees Sky launch its own rugby league magazine programme Boots 'N' All.

 1997
 No events.

 1998
 No events.

 1999
 The first edition of The Super League Show is broadcast on the BBC. It is broadcast to the North West, Yorkshire & North Midlands, North East & Cumbria, and East Yorkshire and Lincolnshire regions on Monday nights.

2000s 
 2000
 Rugby League Raw is broadcast by Yorkshire Television for the first time. The documentary-style programme mixes action with behind-the-scenes footage.
 29 October-15 November – Sky Sports takes over as one of the broadcasters of the Rugby League World Cup and shares coverage of the 2000 Rugby League World Cup with the BBC.

 2001
 No events.

 2002
 No events.

 2003
 No events.

 2004
 Rugby League Raw moves from Yorkshire Television to the BBC and is shown in the North East & Cumbria, Yorkshire & North Midlands, East Yorkshire & Lincolnshire and North West regions. The documentary-style programme focusses on coverage of the National Leagues play-offs.

2005
 No events.

 2006
 Manchester local television station Channel M launches a rugby league magazine called Code XIII. Whilst its main focus is on teams playing in the Greater Manchester area, it also touched upon the progress of other teams in the region including Warrington and Widnes. A spin-off series, Code XIII: Grassroots, focused on local amateur rugby league highlights. The programme ran for three seasons, ending in 2008 after management at Channel M decided that they were not willing to go forward with another series that did not contain game action, and that the asking price for buying in the footage was more than Guardian Media Group could afford.

 2007
 Rugby League Raw is broadcast for the final time due to Sky Sports beginning to show National League rugby.
 9 June – S4C shows the first of four Celtic Crusaders rugby league matches live. The following season, S4C shows five more Celtic Crusaders games.

 2008
 February – Having previously only been broadcast as a regional programme, The Super League Show is broadcast nationally for the first time when it is given a Tuesday lunchtime slot on BBC Two.
 22 November – Sky Sports' coverage of the Rugby League World Cup ends as the rights for future tournaments move to Premier Sports.

 2009
 25 September – ESPN brings National Rugby League to the UK when it broadcasts the first Preliminary Final live on 25 September, the second Preliminary Final and on 4 October it shows the Grand Final.

2010s
2010
 No events.

2011
 No events.

2012
 March – Premier Sports begins broadcasting up to 32 games from the Rugby Football League Championship, Championship 1 and Championship Cup in the 2012 season.
 Sky Sports broadcasts games from the Challenge Cup for the first time.

2013
 26 October-30 November – Premier Sports broadcasts its first major international sporting event when it is joint broadcaster with the BBC of the 2013 Rugby League World Cup. The channel also provides live coverage of the 2017 event.

2014
 Premier Sports and BBC Sport replace Sky Sports as broadcaster of the Rugby League Four Nations tournament.

2015
 November – After 20 seasons on air, the final edition of Sky Sports’ rugby league magazine Boots 'N' All is broadcast.

2016
 Premier Sports begins showing all 201 games of rugby league from the Australian National Rugby League alongside the NRL Footy Show, State of Origin series, NRL Full Time and Rugby League Back Chat.

2017
 3 November – The BBC announces that it has signed deals with a number of different sports to bring 1,000 extra hours of live sports coverage each year. The increase in free-to-air sport includes coverage of the entire Rugby League Challenge Cup.

2018
 Coverage of the Australia and New Zealand's National Rugby League returns to Sky Sports on a five-year contract. The deal includes selected matches from the Telstra Premiership plus the NRL Grand Final as well as the State of Origin series, Pacific Tests, Auckland Nines and the All Stars Match.
 28 April – FreeSports begins showing live coverage of matches from rugby league’s National Conference League with more than 30 matches to be shown over the course of the season.

2019
 26 October-16 November – BBC Sport broadcasts live coverage of rugby league’s British Lions tour to New Zealand.

2020s
 2020
 No events.

 2021
 No events.

 2022
 12 February – Live Super League matches are broadcast on free-to-air television for the first time when Channel 4 shows the first of ten matches each season for the next two years. This is the first time in its 40-year history that channel 4has broadcast rugby league.
 Premier Sports broadcasts the RFL Championship. Coverage includes the regular season, the Play-Offs in the autumn culminating in the Million Pound Game and every match of the Summer Bash featuring all 14 clubs in a single venue on the same weekend. The deal also includes the 2023 season.
 15 October-19 November – The BBC broadcasts live coverage of all 61 games from the men’s, women’s and wheelchair tournaments of the 2021 Rugby League World Cup.

References

rugby league on UK television
rugby league on UK television
rugby league on UK television
Sports television in the United Kingdom
rugby league on UK television
Rugby league in the United Kingdom